Aspen Hill is a census-designated place and an unincorporated area in Montgomery County, Maryland, United States. It is located 6 miles north of Washington D.C. Its population as of the 2020 census was 51,063.

Etymology
The community name is derived from aspen trees that once were found near the first post office in the area. The post office was located in a general store on what was then known as the Washington-Brookeville Pike (now the intersection of Connecticut and Georgia Avenues) and opened circa 1864.

History
In the 1920s and 1930s, Aspen Hill was known as being the location of Aspin Hill Memorial Park, one of three pet cemeteries then operating on the East Coast of the United States. Burials at Aspen Hill Cemetery included dogs that had served the during World War I as well as the pets of area residents. Memorial ceremonies honoring pets were often held there on World Day for Animals.

In July 1950, Louis M. Denit sold  of land in Aspen Hill to Gelman Construction Company for approximately $300,000. Denit was a well-known attorney who specialized in banking and trust law. Gelman Construction Company bought the land in order to build 2,450 three-bedroom ramblers, a shopping center, schools, playgrounds, and churches. The homes were priced at less $10,000 each.

In January 1955, Minnie Goodman sold  of land in Aspen Hill to Metropolitan Homes, Inc. At the time, the land was the last vacant tract of land of its size between Rockville and Wheaton. Metropolitan Homes planned to build 12,000 homes, schools, shopping centers, and churches on the land. Prices for the homes started at $15,000 each.

Aspen Hill was one of the locations in which a fatal shooting took place in October 2002 as part of the Beltway sniper attacks.

Geography 
As a census-designated place, Aspen Hill's boundaries are defined by the U.S. Census Bureau. The United States Postal Service does not accept “Aspen Hill” as a place name; addresses in the community must use the place names Rockville, Silver Spring, or Wheaton.

Some addresses use Wheaton (20906), notably in the Aspen Hill Shopping Center, while immediately across Aspen Hill Road at the Northgate Plaza Shopping Center, the addresses use Silver Spring (20906). Immediately to the west across Connecticut Avenue, addresses use Rockville (20853). As a result, crime statistics which are reasonably considered as belonging to Aspen Hill are buried in the statistics of three different areas. Aspen Hill straddles a corner where three statistical areas meet in what locals consider the commercial heart of Aspen Hill.

The United States Census Bureau, defines Aspen Hill as a census-designated place located at 39°6' North, 77°5' West. In the 2000 Census Bureau Gazetteer, Aspen Hill was located at  (39.088525, −77.080267).

Other organizations, such as the Aspen Hill Civic Association, Inc. (AHCA) (2021), have their own definitions. For the most accurate boundaries and geographical map of the AHCA visit Aspen Hill Civic Association, Inc., Boundaries & Map (AHCA) (2021). 
This an archived website from the early 2000's Aspen Hill Civic Association, Inc.. The Aspen Hill Civic Association, Inc. has been serving the community since 1985 for over 35 years in Aspen Hill, Montgomery County, Maryland.

Other local resources such as the Montgomery Gazette and the Washington Post use a more broad definition. Generally speaking, if it is not a part of Manor Country Club or Leisure World, and is south of Norbeck Road and north of Veirs Mill Road, east of Rock Creek and west of Bel Pre Creek or Matthew Henson State Park or Matthew Henson Greenway, the local media consider it to be Aspen Hill.

Education
For the most accurate listing of schools visit the Aspen Hill Civic Association, Inc., Public Schools (AHCA) (2021). The Aspen Hill Civic Association, Inc. has been serving the community since 1985 for over 35 years in Aspen Hill, Montgomery County, Maryland. The Aspen Hill Civic Association, Inc. serves the following elementary schools within the AHCA boundaries: Wheaton Woods Elementary School, Rock Creek Valley Elementary School, Brookhaven Elementary School,  Lucy Barnsley Elementary School, and Harmony Hills Elementary School. The Aspen Hill Civic Association, Inc. serves the following middle schools within the AHCA boundaries: Earle B Wood Middle School, and Parkland Middle School. Students within the AHCA boundaries area is served by both Rockville and Wheaton High Schools located outside the civic association boundaries.  Other special or magnet schools serve residents as well.

Aspen Hill is also served by Bel Pre, Flower Valley, and Strathmore elementary schools. Older students living in Aspen Hill generally attend Earle B. Wood Middle School, Parkland Middle School, or Argyle Middle School. Rockville High School, Wheaton High School, and Kennedy High School serve Aspen Hill's teenagers.

Melvin J. Berman Hebrew Academy is in Aspen Hill CDP.

Demographics

As of the census of 2010, there were 48,759 people, 16,697	households, and 11,959 families living in the community. The racial makeup of the area was 50.60% White, 21.70% Black or African American, 0.60% Native American, 10.9% Asian, 0.00% Pacific Islander, 11.5% from other races, and 4.6% from two or more races. 27.9% of the population were Hispanic or Latino of any race. 37.2 of the population were non-Hispanic whites and 13.4% were White Latinos. 20.9% were non-Hispanic African-Americans and less than 1% were Afro-Latino.

As of 2010, the Hispanic and Latino community in Aspen Hill was predominantly Central American, especially Salvadoran. 40% of Aspen Hill's Latino community was Salvadoran, 6% Honduran, 6% Guatemalan and 3% Nicaraguan. 8% of Latinos were of Mexican descent. Less than 2% were of Spaniard descent. 22% of Aspen Hill's Latinos were of South American descent, with 8% being Peruvian American, 4% being Colombian American, and 4% being Bolivian American. 3% of Latinos were Puerto Rican, 3% were Dominican American, 2% were Chilean American, 2% were Ecuadorian American, and 1% were Cuban American. Costa Ricans, Panamanians, Argentines, Paraguayans, Uruguayans and Venezuelans each constituted 1% or less of the Latino population.

As of the census of 2000, there were 50,228 people, 18,187 households, and 13,076 families living in the community. The racial makeup of the area was 55.60% White, 20.98% Black or African American, 0.33% Native American, 11.51% Asian, 0.06% Pacific Islander, 7.48% from other races, and 4.04% from two or more races. 15.44% of the population were Hispanic or Latino of any race. 9% of Aspen Hill's residents were Irish, 9% German, 7% English, 4% Central American, 4% Italian, 4% Subsaharan African 3% Chinese, 3% South American, 3% West Indian, 3% Korean, 3% Polish, 3% Salvadoran, 2% Russian, 2% Indian, 2% Scottish and 2% Jamaican. People of Vietnamese, Arab, Mexican, French, Greek, Filipino, Scotch-Irish, Welsh, Brazilian, Ukrainian, Peruvian, Haitian, Dutch, Bolivian, Swedish, Puerto Rican, Thai, Guatemalan, Hungarian, Colombian and French-Canadian descent each comprised 1% of the population.

There were 18,187 households, out of which 33.3% had children under the age of 18 living with them, 53.7% were married couples living together, 14.1% had a female householder with no husband present, and 28.1% were non-families. 21.9% of all households were made up of individuals, and 7.6% had someone living alone who was 65 years of age or older. The average household size was 2.74 and the average family size was 3.18.

In the area the population was spread out, with 24.0% under the age of 18, 7.7% from 18 to 24, 31.8% from 25 to 44, 24.0% from 45 to 64, and 12.5% who were 65 years of age or older. The median age was 37 years. For every 100 females, there were 89.9 males. For every 100 females age 18 and over, there were 85.7 males.

The median income for a household in the area was $63,340, and the median income for a family was $73,736 (these figures had risen to $75,014 and $81,474 respectively as of a 2007 estimate). Males had a median income of $44,341 versus $36,739 for females. The per capita income for the area was $27,905. About 4.6% of families and 6.8% of the population were below the poverty line, including 8.0% of those under age 18 and 6.4% of those age 65 or over.

References

External links

 
Census-designated places in Maryland
Census-designated places in Montgomery County, Maryland
Hispanic and Latino American culture in Maryland
Honduran-American culture
Salvadoran-American culture